Hyatella or Hyattella may refer to:
 , a genus of sponges in the family Spongiidae
 Hyatella, a genus of arachnid in the family Ascidae, synonym of Lasioseius
 Hyatella, a genus of bivalves in the family Hiatellidae, synonym of Hiatella